Enrique Montano (born May 28, 1993) is an American professional soccer player who plays as a defender.

Career
Montano spent three seasons playing for the San Jose State Spartans before signing professionally with Louisville City FC of the United Soccer League on February 19, 2015. He then made his professional debut for the team on May 2 against the Charlotte Independence. He started and played the whole match as Louisville City lost 1–0.

Career statistics

References

External links
 Louisville City profile

1993 births
Living people
American soccer players
San Jose State Spartans men's soccer players
Louisville City FC players
Sacramento Republic FC players
FC Tulsa players
Association football defenders
Soccer players from California
USL Championship players
Sportspeople from Salinas, California
Coras de Nayarit F.C. footballers
Hartnell College alumni